De'Adre Danielle Aziza (born June 14, 1977) is an American actress and singer.

Early life and education
Aziza was born in Atlanta, Georgia and raised in Teaneck, New Jersey. She is the daughter of Donna Avery, retired part-time assistant professor and textiles specialist at Parsons The New School for Design. She attended the Harlem School of the Arts for eleven years and the Dance Theater of Harlem for five. She is a graduate of the Tisch School of the Arts at New York University.

Career
She received a Tony Award nomination for Best Featured Actress in a Musical for Passing Strange, in which she played "teenage goddess" Edwina Williams, Dutch neo-hippie Marianna, and German revolutionary/filmmaker Sudabey. She appeared again on Broadway in Women on the Verge of a Nervous Breakdown.

Filmography

Film

Television

References

External links
 
 

1977 births
Living people
African-American actresses
American stage actresses
People from Teaneck, New Jersey
Tisch School of the Arts alumni
Actresses from New Jersey
Singers from New Jersey
21st-century American women singers
Theatre World Award winners
African-American women singers